Who Will Cry When You Die is a book written by the Canadian Indian writer Robin Sharma. The book was first published in 1999. This was the third book written by the author in the series The Monk Who Sold His Ferrari.

Synopsis 
The book is divided into full chapters. Each chapter offers solutions and suggestions to face some of the difficult problems of life and develop one's personality and personal skills. Some of the suggestions mentioned in this book are— carrying goal cards, learning from good movies, seeing a day as an entire life, learning how to walk, importance of planting trees etc.

References 

1999 non-fiction books
Self-help books